Cannabis in Qatar is illegal.

A 2000 report by UNODC estimated the prevalence of adult use of cannabis in Qatar to be between 1-.4%, but increasing.

References

Qatar
Politics of Qatar
Society of Qatar
Qatar